Altun Bogha Mosque is one of the oldest mosques in Aleppo, Syria. It is located in the Ancient part of the city, east to the Citadel of Aleppo. It is also known as the mosque of Sahat al-Milh or the Salt square mosque, as it was built near a large salt warehouse.

History
The mosque was built in 1318 by the Circassian ruler of Aleppo; emir Alaaddin Altun Bogha al-Nasiri, during the reign of the Mamluk sultan Al-Nasir Muhammad. It was built on the place of one of the earliest mosques in Aleppo, the mosque of al-Midan al-Aswad. The dome of the mosque is famous for its internal decoration characterized with the traditional Islamic muqarnas.

In the modern era, the mosque was partially renovated in 1921.

References

Mamluk mosques in Syria
Mosques in Aleppo
14th-century mosques
Religious buildings and structures completed in 1318